Alan Jenkins (born 24 July 1947) is an engineer and designer who worked in Formula One with McLaren, Arrows, Onyx, Prost, and Stewart, and in CART with Penske.

References

1947 births
Living people
British motorsport people
Formula One designers
English motorsport people
Arrows Grand Prix International